Wariapano (Huariapano), also known as Pano, Panavarro, and Pánobo, is an obsolescent Panoan language of Peru. 

There are three attested dialects: Shetebo and Piskino, which are no longer in daily use, and Pano itself, which is extinct.

References

Panoan languages
Extinct languages of South America